The Aero was a range of concept car studies created by General Motors as a testbed for future aerodynamic improvements to car bodies. The first model was the 1981 Aero X, a five-door hatchback.

In 1982 the Aero 2000 was shown, a smaller two-door car, it had several unique features, such as front and rear fender skirts, a kammback design, and a smoothed underbelly.  Almost all of these features have been incorporated into modern hybrid car designs at some point, with the exception of front fender skirts. The Aero 2000 had a drag coefficient of 0.23, but had no engine so could not be driven.

The Aero 2002 was shown a year later at the 1983 with its much improved  of 0.14. Designed by Irvin Rybicki, it was to influence the 1984 Chevrolet Citation IV Concept

References 

 Aerodynamics of Road Vehicles.  Edited by Wolf-Heinrich Hucho. (c) Butterworth & Co. (Publishers) Ltd, 1987. Boston (c)1987.
 Five GM Concept models. Car Styling 44, Autumn 1983, pp 6–23
 Autospeed.com

Aero 2000